Dmitriy Pavlovich Stukalov (born 2 May 1951 in Leningrad) is a Russian former hurdler who competed in the 1976 Summer Olympics.

References

1951 births
Living people
Soviet male hurdlers
Russian male hurdlers
Olympic athletes of the Soviet Union
Athletes (track and field) at the 1976 Summer Olympics
European Athletics Championships medalists
Athletes from Saint Petersburg
Universiade medalists in athletics (track and field)
Universiade gold medalists for the Soviet Union
Universiade bronze medalists for the Soviet Union